"He Is Your Brother" is a song recorded in 1972 by Swedish pop group ABBA, at the time known as "Björn & Benny, Agnetha & Anni-Frid".

The song continued on the lyrical theme from "People Need Love" about reaching out to your fellow man. It was issued as a single in Scandinavia, and was taken from the group's debut album Ring Ring, which was released in 1973 in Scandinavia and a few European countries, excluding the United Kingdom. The catalogue number for Scandinavian releases on the Polar label is: POS 1168. The catalogue number in New Zealand is FAY 1054 on the Family label, the previous issue on this label being "People Need Love". The catalogue number in the United States is P 50037 on Playboy Records label.

Track listings

Sweden 
A. "He Is Your Brother"

B. "Santa Rosa"

USA 
A. "He Is Your Brother"

B. "I Saw It In The Mirror"

USA (Mono / Stereo)

A. "He Is Your Brother"

B. "He Is Your Brother"

History
The song was written and composed by Benny Andersson & Björn Ulvaeus. All four ABBA members share lead-vocals on this recording.

The song was one of the early favourites among the group's members, and was the only song from the group's first album which was performed during the group's 1977 tour of Europe and Australia. It was performed by artists (along with ABBA), during the Music for UNICEF Concert in January 1979.

Reception
Due to its limited release, and the fact that ABBA had not achieved a great following outside of their native Sweden at the time, the song only charted in Scandinavian countries. In Sweden, it did not reach the Swedish sales chart but was a big radio hit reaching #1 on the Tio i Topp singles chart.
The single was also released in New Zealand on the local Family Label.
"He is Your Brother" was released as a single in the United States in 1973 on the Playboy label, catalogue number Playboy Records – P 50037, with "I Saw It In The Mirror" on the B-side.

In popular culture
 ABBA performed the song live in the film ABBA: The Movie (1977).

Cover versions
The song was covered by ABBA tribute pop group Arrival on their 1999 album First Flight.

Svenne & Lotta, Swedish duo with connections to ABBA, recorded the song as a b-side to their cover of ABBA's "Dance (While the Music Still Goes On)".

Santa Rosa
The B-side of the single, "Santa Rosa" had the working title "Grandpa's Banjo" and was originally recorded in 1972 with the intention of releasing it as single in Japan. It was considered a "Bjorn And Benny" track. The writers have explained their dislike of the song, saying that the lyrics were clumsy due to the fact they only put the name "Santa Rosa" in because it fit the song; they actually came from Stockholm.

References

1972 singles
ABBA songs
Polar Music singles
Songs written by Benny Andersson and Björn Ulvaeus
1972 songs